The 1952 Queen's Birthday Honours in New Zealand, celebrating the official birthday of Elizabeth II, were appointments made by the Queen on the advice of the New Zealand government to various orders and honours to reward and highlight good works by New Zealanders. They were the first birthday honours of the new queen's reign, and were announced on 5 June 1952.

The recipients of honours are displayed here as they were styled before their new honour.

Knight Bachelor
 The Honourable Matthew Henry Oram  – Speaker of the House of Representatives.

Order of Saint Michael and Saint George

Knight Commander (KCMG)
 The Right Honourable William Joseph Jordan – High Commissioner in London for New Zealand (1936–1951).

Companion (CMG)
 Edgar Ravenswood McKillop  – Commissioner of Works.
 The Most Reverend Dr Campbell West West-Watson  – Primate, Archbishop and Metropolitan of New Zealand (1940–1951).

Order of the British Empire

Commander (CBE)
Civil division
 Professor Eric Raymond Hudson – of Canterbury Agricultural College, Lincoln. For services to agriculture.
 Noel Rutherford Jameson – chairman of the New Zealand Wool Board and deputy chairman of the Wool Commission.
 Leonard John Wild  – of Ōtaki. For services to education and agriculture.

Military division
 Surgeon Captain Eric Snow McPhail   – Royal New Zealand Navy.

Officer (OBE)
Civil division
 Alfred Thomas Carroll – of Wairoa. For services to the Māori race.
 Geoffrey Jasper St Clair Fisher  – a gynaecologist in Auckland.
 Flora McMillan Forde – president of the National Council of Women.
 Alfred Onslow Glasse  – of Auckland. For services in the field of engineering.
 Ronald Joseph Macdonald  – of Dannevirke. For services to the farming industry.
 William Smith MacGregor MacGibbon – of Christchurch. For services to commerce and local government.
 Norman Alfred McKenzie – of Napier.  For services to sport in New Zealand.
 Geoffrey Tremaine – of Palmerston North. For services to local government.
 Edward Earle Vaile. For services to the community in Auckland.

Military division
 Commander John Michael Sharpey-Schafer – Royal Navy.
 Lieutenant-Colonel Walter Gordon Morrison – New Zealand Territorial Force.

Member (MBE)
Civil division
 Clarice Mary Anderson – of Auckland. For social welfare services.
 Hilda Daniels – of Christchurch. For services to the Māori people in the field of education.
 Mary Florence Geard. For services to the community in Northland.
 Horace Grocott. For services in connection with the Boys' Brigade movement in New Zealand.
 Anne Amelia Hambly – of Auckland. For social welfare services.
 Vivian Simeon Jacobs – of Dunedin. For social welfare services.
 William David Stoney Johnston . For services to the community in Nelson.
 Ethel Margaret Kinross – of Havelock North. For services to the Māori people in the field of education.
 Ernest Loader  – of Taihape. For services to local government.
 Charlton Douglas Morpeth  – of Wellington. For services to the community. Deceased: appointment dated 19 May 1952.
 Charles Stephen Morris  – of Newton, Auckland. For services to the community, especially in the field of education.
 Mavis Helen Pairman  – of Mangaweka. For services to the community.
 Alma Evelyne Penketh – of Palmerston North. For social welfare services, especially in connection with women's organisations.
 Elsie Erica Pryor – matron of the Waipiata Sanatorium for 16 years.
 George Claude Russell – of Christchurch. For services to the community.
 Ida Russell – Memorial Hospital, Hastings. For services in the nursing profession.
 Maude Frances Tait  – president of the women's branch, New Zealand Borstal Association.
 Clifford Hudson Tate – president of the Town Clerks' Association.

Military division
 Captain (temporary Major) Morley Guy Fowler – Royal New Zealand Armoured Corps.
 Warrant Officer First Class William Galloway – New Zealand Regiment.
 Lieutenant Arthur Trevor Slater – New Zealand Territorial Force.
 Flight Lieutenant Clifford Maurice Crawford – Royal New Zealand Air Force.
 Flight Lieutenant Trevelyn William Tremayne – New Zealand Territorial Air Force.
 Warrant Officer Desmond Owen Hardwick – Royal New Zealand Air Force.

Companion of the Imperial Service Order (ISO)
 Robert Adams Patterson – lately government architect and a member of the Town Planning Board.
 Tipi Tainui Ropiha – under-secretary of Māori Affairs.

British Empire Medal (BEM)
Military division
 Chief Petty Officer Stoker Mechanic Harold Edward Groves – Royal New Zealand Navy.
 Chief Petty Officer Charles Long – Royal New Zealand Navy.
 Chief Yeoman of Signals John James O'Meara – Royal New Zealand Naval Volunteer Reserve.
 Flight Sergeant Walter James Croft – Royal New Zealand Air Force.

Queen's Commendation for Valuable Service in the Air
 Flying Officer Utiku Albert Potaka – Royal New Zealand Air Force.
 Flight Sergeant Engineer Donald John Macleod – Royal New Zealand Air Force.

References

Birthday Honours
1952 awards
1952 in New Zealand
New Zealand awards